
Aukštaitija National Park is a national park in north-eastern Lithuania, about 100 km north of Vilnius. Established in 1974, it is the oldest of the five national parks in Lithuania. At first it was named Lithuanian SSR National Park to emphasize that it was the first such park in the republic. In 1991 four other parks were established and were named after ethnographic regions of Lithuania. The park was renamed after Aukštaitija.

The park covers 410.56 km². Ignalina district municipality controls about 50% of the area. Utena and Švenčionys district municipalities control 25%. Strictly protected areas occupy 2.1%. One can enter this territory only accompanied by a park employee.  More than 70 percent of its area is covered by woods. 80 percent of woods are pine stands, some reaching 200 years old.

Sixty-four species of plant, eight species of fungus and 48 species of bird found in the park are included in Lithuania's Red book. The park is famous for its biodiversity:  59% of all plant species in Lithuania can be found in the park, which covers less than 1% of Lithuania.

Waters

One hundred and twenty-six lakes are scattered among the woods and hills.  Many are interconnected by rivulets and streams and are popular for kayaking. Since the park was established more than 40 years ago, the infrastructure for water tourism had been well developed. There are a lot of sites where boats and kayaks can be hired and for overnight stays. The lakes cover 59.30 km² (or 15.5%) of the park.  The largest of the lakes is Lake Kretuonas (8.29 km²). Lake Tauragnas, the deepest in Lithuania (60.5 m), is also here. There are 14 lakes bigger than 1 km². Six lakes are between 0.5 and 1 km² and 35 lakes between 5 and 50 ha. The rest are smaller than 5 ha and some are gradually turning into swamps.

Lake Baluošas contains seven islands, one of which has a small lake of its own. A small stream flows from this lake to Baluošas, which makes it unique in Lithuania. The longest river is Žeimena (22 km in the park, up to 114 km in total). It is very clean and flows into Neris. All lakes and rivulets belong to the Žeimena basin.

One of the most famous sights in the Park is Ladakalnis hill, from the top of which six lakes can be seen. It is a geomorphological monument.

Villages

There are 116 villages in the park with about 2300 residents. The first villages are mentioned in the 14th century (Vilnius, the capital of Lithuania, was first mentioned in written sources in 1323). The most famous of the villages is Palūšė where the park administration is based. The church, built in 1750, is thought to be the oldest surviving wooden church in Lithuania and was featured on 1 litas banknote. Stripeikiai is the oldest village in the park, now known for its unique Lithuanian Museum of Ancient Beekeeping. Ginučiai is another famous village and tourists are attracted by its 19th-century watermill. Being one of the few mills that still has the original mechanisms, it has been declared an engineering monument. Two hillforts of national importance are nearby. Kaltanėnai, with 300 inhabitants, is the largest village.

A classic 1972 Lithuanian film about the outlaw and national folk hero Tadas Blinda was filmed in the Šuminai.  This and five other villages have been declared architectural monuments.

Archaeology

Random findings show that the area was inhabited about 9000–8000 years BCE. More abundant artifacts come from about 3000 BCE. It is considered that the oldest settlements were established in the area. There are 45 burial sites dating from the 4th-12th centuries. The sites feature from several to 400 tumuluses (usually a couple of metres in diameter, but the biggest is 20 metres). Tumuli are usually surrounded by a ring of stones or a shallow ditch. People were buried together with objects they might need in the afterlife - jewellery, tools, guns, even horses. The park also has 11 hillforts.

See also
 Lake Šakarvai
 List of national parks in the Baltics

References

External links 

 Tourism.lt
 
 Travel to Lithuania

National parks of Lithuania
Protected areas established in 1974
Tourist attractions in Utena County